The Mraka is a historical-geographical area in present-day Western Bulgaria, covering the northeastern slopes of the Konyavska Mountain and the Zemen mountain. On the other side is the Radomir plane, located respectively in the municipalities of Radomir, Kovachevtsi and Zemen.

The Mraka is separated from the neighboring region of Graovo, which occupies the Pernik-Breznik plane, by the mountain Golo Bardo.

The earliest surviving manuscript that mentions this name is the so-called "Dragolj Code" from the third quarter of the 13th century.

References